The KOSÉ Shin Yokohama Skate Center (KOSÉ新横浜スケートセンター) is an indoor sporting arena located in Yokohama, Kanagawa, Japan. The arena opened in 1990. It has a total capacity of 2,500 people (1,406 seated and 1,094 standing). It is the home ice of the Asia League Ice Hockey team Yokohama Grits.

In addition to ice hockey games, it can accommodate ice skating events and leisure skating throughout the year.

The Tokyo based cosmetics Corporation, Kosé, acquired the naming right of the arena, originally named Shin Yokohama Skate Center, in 2017.

The arena is located around five minutes' walk from Shin-Yokohama Station, a station on the Yokohama Line.

References

 Official web 
 National Stadiums Web

Indoor ice hockey venues in Japan
Indoor arenas in Japan
Sports venues in Yokohama
Sports venues completed in 1990
1990 establishments in Japan